HMBS may refer to:
Her/His Majesty's Britannic Ship, Her/His Majesty's Bahamian Ship, Her/His Majesty's Bermudian Ship, and Her/His Majesty's Burmese Ship - various ship prefixes. See Her Majesty's Ship.
HMBS (gene), hydroxymethylbilane synthase gene, involved in heme biosynthesis